Daniel H. Geschwind is the Gordon and Virginia MacDonald Distinguished Professor of Human Genetics, Neurology and Psychiatry at the David Geffen School of Medicine at the University of California, Los Angeles (UCLA). He also directs the UCLA Neurogenetics Program and the UCLA Center for Autism Research and Treatment (CART), and holds the Gordon and Virginia MacDonald Distinguished Chair of Human Genetics there. Since March 1, 2016, he has served as the Senior Associate Dean and Associate Vice Chancellor for Precision Medicine at UCLA. His brother, Michael Geschwind, is also a professor of neurology, and behavioral neurology pioneer Norman Geschwind is his father's first cousin.

Education and career
Geschwind received his A.B. degrees in psychology and chemistry at Dartmouth College, and his MD/PhD at Yale School of Medicine under the supervision of Susan Hockfield. He then completed an internship at UCLA, and has been a member of the UCLA faculty since 1997. Geschwind has served on several scientific advisory boards and review committees, including the Faculty of 1000 Medicine, the Executive Committee of the American Neurological Association, the Scientific Advisory Board for the Allen Institute for Brain Science, the NIMH Advisory Council and the NIH Council of Councils, and served as the first chair of Cure Autism Now's scientific review committee. Geschwind has been elected as member of the National Academy of Medicine and the Association of American Physicians. , Geschwind was the 25th highest-paid employee of the University of California system.

Research

The Geschwind Lab at the UCLA David Geffin School of Medicine conducts research into three areas: autism and language, human cognitive specializations, and neurodegenerative syndromes.  He has published research examining the numerous genes involved in language, such as FOXP2, and how they differ between humans and chimpanzees.

In 2011, Geschwind was senior author on a study which found that there are chemical differences between the brains of people with autism and the brains of people without it. Specifically, Geschwind et al. found that there were common patterns in the gene expression in the frontal and temporal lobes of the brains of the autistic people they studied. He is also known for his research into the factors affecting handedness in humans, and the differences in brain structure between left-handed and right-handed people.

Awards and prizes
 2022 Rhoda and Bernard Sarnat International Prize in Mental Health from the National Academy of Medicine
 2012 Ruane Prize for Outstanding Achievement in Child and Adolescent Psychiatric Research from the Brain & Behavior Research Foundation
 2008 Scientific Service Award from Autism Speaks
 2004 Derek Denny-Brown Neurological Scholar Award from the American Neurological Association
 Named in Clarivate Analytics' 2017 Highly Cited Researchers

References

American geneticists
American neuroscientists
Autism researchers
Dartmouth College alumni
Living people
Members of the National Academy of Medicine
David Geffen School of Medicine at UCLA faculty
Yale School of Medicine alumni
Year of birth missing (living people)